GYI may refer to:

 Gisenyi Airport, Rwanda
 Gyele language, spoken in Cameroon
 North Texas Regional Airport, United States
 Gyi, an honorific in Burmese names
 Ant Gyi, Burmese singer